Assumption High School is a Roman Catholic high school in Wisconsin Rapids, Wisconsin, in the Diocese of La Crosse.

Assumption was established in 1951. It is the only high school in the Wisconsin Rapids Area Catholic Schools, which also operates one middle school, and three primary/elementary schools.

Athletics
The Assumption Royals compete in the Central Wisconsin Conference-Small for football and the Marawood Conference for all other athletics.

References

External links
 School System website

Roman Catholic Diocese of La Crosse
Catholic secondary schools in Wisconsin
Schools in Wood County, Wisconsin
Educational institutions established in 1951
Wisconsin Rapids, Wisconsin
1951 establishments in Wisconsin